Yabem, or Jabêm, is an Austronesian language of Papua New Guinea.

Overview
Yabem belongs to the division of the Melanesian languages spoken natively (in 1978) by about 2,000 people at Finschhafen, which is on the southern tip of the Huon Peninsula in Morobe Province, Papua New Guinea, despite historical evidence that shows that the language originated in the northern coast. However, Yabem was adopted as local lingua franca along with Kâte for evangelical and educational purposes by the German Lutheran missionaries who first arrived at Simbang, a Yabem-speaking village, in 1885. Yabem was the first language for which the missionaries created a writing system because it was the first language that they encountered when they arrived. They even created a school system to provide education for the Yabem community.

By 1939, it was spoken by as many as 15,000 people and understood by as many as 100,000 (Zahn 1940). In the decade after World War II, the mission's network of schools managed to educate 30,000 students by using Yabem as the medium of instruction (Streicher 1982). Although the usage of Yabem as a local lingua franca was replaced by Tok Pisin, which was used in informal everyday life, such as religious meetings and the workplace, and English, which was used in more formal institutions like education and government in the 1950s, Yabem remains one of the best-documented Austronesian languages, with extensive instructional and liturgical materials (including many original compositions, not just translations from German or English) as well as grammars and dictionaries. The government wanted an easier assimilation to Western culture and values and access to their superior educational resources and so English was the most efficient language of instruction.

Still, the transition from the usage of Kâte and Yabem, which are languages with local origins, to Tok Pisin and English, which are languages with foreign origins, affected the dynamic of the people and their view of language and the church somewhat negatively.

Yabem also shares a close relationship with the Kela and Bukawa languages. In fact, many people who speak Bukawa also speak Yabem.

Ethnologue classifies the language's status as "threatened." Its alternative names include Laulabu, Jabem, Jabêm, Jabim, Yabim, and Yabêm.

Phonology

Vowels (orthographic) 
Yabem distinguishes seven vowel qualities.

Consonants (orthographic) 
The glottal stop, written with a -c, is distinctive only at the end of syllables. The only other consonants that can occur there are labials and nasals: p, b, m, ŋ. The liquid  is realized as either a flap  or a lateral . Syllable-structure constraints are most easily explained if labialized and prenasalized consonants are considered to be unit phonemes rather than clusters. However, Otto Dempwolff, who greatly influenced the German missionary orthographies in New Guinea, apparently did not sanction labialized labials, preferring instead to signal rounding on labials by the presence of a round mid vowel (-o- or -ô-) between the labial consonant and the syllable nucleus, as in vs.  'you'll come' vs.  'he'll come' or  'you'll dwell' vs.  'you'll be sick' (Dempwolff 1939). (Compare the orthographies of Sio and Kâte.)

Tone 
Yabem has a simple system of register tone that distinguishes high-tone syllables from low-tone ones. In the standard orthography, high-tone syllables are unmarked, and the nuclei of low-tone syllables are marked with a grave accent, as in  'sun' vs.  'my foot' or  'breadfruit' vs.  'hunting net'. Tone distinctions in Yabem appear to be of relatively recent origin (Bradshaw 1979) and still correlate strongly with obstruent voicing contrasts (but not in its closest relative, Bukawa). Only high tones occur in syllables with voiceless obstruents (p, t, k), and only low tone occurs in syllables with voiced obstruents (b, d, g). The fricative  is voiced in low-tone syllables but voiceless in high-tone syllables. Other phonemes are neutral with respect to tone and so occur in both high-tone or low-tone environments.

Lexical categories 
Yabem has nouns, verbs, adjectives, pronouns and adverbs. Some categories, such as verbs and nouns, are distinguishable by the types of morphology that they are able to take.

Yabem nouns can take inalienable possessive suffixes, distinguishing person, number and inclusivity/exclusivity. Alienable possessives are indicated by a juxtaposed possessive word. Nouns can also take "affective" suffixes that indicate a speaker's attitude toward that thing: sympathy, affection or ridicule. Examples are from Bradshaw & Czobor (2005) unless otherwise stated:
 – 'man'

Verbs are distinguishable by their prefixes. They can take pronominal prefixes to indicate person, number, and irrealis/realis mode, as can be seen above in the Morphology section.

Some words can function as either nouns or verbs and thus take either nominal or verbal morphology:

 – 'a sail'

Most of these are derived from the sense of the noun originally, though some appear to be derived from actions expressed by verbs:

 – 'laughter'

Grammatical relations and alignment 
Yabem has a nominative-accusative system of alignment, as is evidenced by the pronominal prefixes that appear on verbs that always mark the subject of either a transitive or intransitive verb. There is no case-marking on the nominals themselves, and word order is typically subject–verb–object (SVO). Examples are from Bradshaw & Czobor (2005:10-34) unless otherwise noted:

Subject prefixes can also occur with full subject pronouns, as is shown in the example below. Both bolded morphemes refer to the first-personal singular.

Word order (SVO) is another marker of the nominative/accusative system. Below, the first person singular free pronoun precedes the first whether it is the subject of an intransitive verb or the agent of a transitive verb.

Voice and valency 
Yabem, like many other languages of the area, both Oceanic and Papuan, has no passive voice. There is also no morphological method to create a causative. Detransitivization can be accomplished via periphrastic reflexive/reciprocal phrases, as can be seen below. Example is from Bradshaw (1999:289-91).

Morphological typology 
Yabem shows elements of morphological fusion and agglutination but is not very high in either respect. The primary factor determinative of fusion/agglutination degree is lexical category. Verbs, for example, take subject prefixes, which fusionally mark person, number, inclusivity (for the first person plural), realis/irrealis, and high- and have low-tone variants. Nouns also display low levels of agglutination, sometimes taking possessive suffixes. Verbal derivation is not something that occurs morphologically although nominalization does so. Some derivational morphology for nominalization can be seen below in building a noun via the agentive suffix. In the second example, the patient of a verb (in this case  'woman') is combined with the agent (here  'man') to construct an agentive nominalized form. Examples are from Bradshaw & Czobor (2005:30)

Relative clauses 
Relative clauses are created by use of the demonstrative pronouns/adjectives, which come in several forms themselves.

The three series above represent three degrees of proximity in the demonstratives. First series correlates to something nearest or most relevant to the 1st person (the speaker), and the second series corresponded to the 2nd person (addressee), while the third series corresponds to what is nearest or most relevant to the 3rd person (non-speech act participant). The forms beginning with t- are those that offer a specific or precise degree of evidentiality (with regard to the referent). Examples of this degree of precision can be seen below.

The bolded forms in the above table are the short forms of these demonstratives. They are phonologically reduced but carry no difference in meaning from the long forms. It is these short demonstratives that are used to create relative clauses. The three degrees of proximity as well as the two degrees of evidential precision still come into play when these forms are used as relative pronouns.

It is of note that the t- pronoun may precede the n- form, or two n-/n- forms may co-occur, but the n- form may never precede the t- form.

Serial verb constructions 
Yabem has a rich serial verb construction system (SVC). It incorporates both different subject (switch-subject) SVCs and same subject SVCs. The SVC system is symmetrical. The two verbs of the SVC must agree in mode (realis/irrealis) and must have the same object if they are transitive. Semantic usages include directionals, resultatives, causatives, comitatives and adverbial modifiers:

Morphology

Pronouns and person markers

Free pronouns 
First-person plural inclusive and exclusive are not distinguished in the free pronouns, but are distinguished in the subject prefixes and the genitives.

Genitive pronouns 
The short, underdifferentiated genitive forms are often disambiguated by adding the free pronoun in front.

Subject prefixes on verbs 
Verbs are prefixed to show the person and number of their subjects. (The first-person plural exclusive and second-person plural prefixes are homophonous but can be disambiguated by using the free pronouns in subject position.) The singular prefixes also distinguish realis and irrealis mood (which usually translates to nonfuture vs. future tense). Each prefix also has a high-tone (H) and a low-tone (L) allomorph to meet the tone requirements of each of five conjugation classes.

Possessed nouns

Alienable vs. inalienable possession 
Preposed genitive pronouns are used to mark alienable possession by humans, as in  'my house',  'your fish',  'his brother-in-law (wife's brother)'. Inalienable possession is marked by suffixes directly on the nouns denoting the possessions, which are typically kinship relations and body parts. The underdifferentiated suffixes are often disambiguated by adding the free pronoun in front of the suffixed noun. The final  on the plurals of kin terms is a distributive marker, indicating some but not all of the class to which the noun refers.

Inherent possession 
Genitive relations for other than humans are not marked by either the genitive pronouns (for alienables) or the genitive suffixes (for inalienables). Instead, inherent possession of nouns as progeny or parts of wholes is marked by a prefix , as in   '(tree) branch',  '(men's house) owner', and   '(hen's) chick'. The same is true of adjectives (attributes of other entities) when derived from nouns, as in  'thick, dense' (<  'thicket') or  'muddy, soft' (<  'mud').

Other genitive constructions

The plural version of the suffix is applied to plural nouns or singular nouns that are plural in meaning.

Compounds 
Compound nouns are often composed of two parts, the first of which is the genitive of the second.

Sometimes the compounds are metaphorical in their meaning.

Some compounds include a possessive suffix on the first element of the compound.

Some elements of these body part compounds exist only within the compound.

Less common are compounds that do not expression possessive, but some other kind of genitive relationship, such as apposition.

Numerals 
Traditional counting practices started with the digits of one hand, then continued on the other hand, and then the feet to reach twenty, which translates as 'one person'. Higher numbers are multiples of 'one person'. Nowadays, most counting above five is done in Tok Pisin. As in other Huon Gulf languages, an alternate form of the numeral 'one' functions as an indefinite article. The numeral  'two' can similarly function as an indefinite plural indicating 'a couple, a few, some'. The numeral root  'one' suffixed with the adverbial marker  renders 'one, only one', while the numeral 'two' similarly suffixed renders 'only a few'. Reduplicated numerals form distributives:  'one by one',  'in threes', etc.

Vocabulary 
Due to the limited amount of consonants and vowels in the Yabem language, pronunciation is critical in order to get the correct meaning across. In some cases, simply changing the accent on a letter can change the meaning of a word entirely.

*Table taken from "Tonogeneis in the North Huon Gulf Chain" by Malcolm D. Ross

References

 Bisang, Walter (1986). "Die Verb-Serialisierung im Jabêm." Lingua 70:131–162.
 Bradshaw, Joel (1979). "Obstruent harmony and tonogenesis in Jabêm." Lingua 49:189–205.
 Bradshaw, Joel (1983). "Dempwolff’s description of verb serialization in Yabem." In Amram Halim, Lois Carrington, and S. A. Wurm, eds., Papers from the Third International Conference on Austronesian Linguistics, vol. 4, Thematic variation, 177–198. Series C-77. Canberra: Pacific Linguistics.
 Bradshaw, Joel (1993). "Subject relationships within serial verb constructions in Numbami and Jabêm." Oceanic Linguistics 32:133–161.
 Bradshaw, Joel (1998). "Squib: Another look at velar lenition and tonogenesis in Jabêm." Oceanic Linguistics 37:178-181.
 Bradshaw, Joel (1999). "Null subjects, switch-reference, and serialization in Jabêm and Numbami." Oceanic Linguistics 38:270–296.
 Bradshaw, Joel (2001). "The elusive shape of the realis/irrealis distinction in Jabêm." In Joel Bradshaw and Kenneth L. Rehg, eds., Issues in Austronesian morphology: A focusschrift for Byron W. Bender, 75–85. Pacific Linguistics 519. Canberra: Pacific Linguistics. 
 Bradshaw, Joel, and Francisc Czobor (2005). Otto Dempwolff's grammar of the Jabêm language in New Guinea. Oceanic Linguistics Special Publication No. 32. Honolulu: University of Hawai‘i Press. 
 Dempwolff, Otto (1939). Grammatik der Jabêm-Sprache auf Neuguinea. Abhandlungen aus dem Gebiet der Auslandskunde, vol. 50. Hamburg: Friederichsen de Gruyter.
 Ross, Malcolm (1993). "Tonogenesis in the North Huon Gulf chain." In Jerold A. Edmondson and Kenneth J. Gregerson, eds., Tonality in Austronesian languages, 133–153. Oceanic Linguistics Special Publication No. 24. Honolulu: University of Hawai‘i Press. 
 Streicher, J. F. (1982). Jabêm–English dictionary. Series C-68. Canberra: Pacific Linguistics. (First compiled by Heinrich Zahn in 1917; later translated and revised by J. F. Streicher.)
 Zahn, Heinrich (1940). Lehrbuch der Jabêmsprache (Deutsch-Neuguinea). Zeitschrift für Eingeborenen-Sprache, Beiheft 21. Berlin: Reimer.

External links
 Yabem Wordlist at the Austronesian Basic Vocabulary Database
 Paradisec has two collections of Arthur Capell's materials (AC1, AC2), which include Yabem language materials
 Paradisec's Malcolm Ross collection includes Yabem language materials
 Paradisec's collection of Meinrad Scheller's field recordings includes Yabem language materials

Bibliography
 Bisang, Walter (1986). "Die Verb-Serialisierung im Jabêm." Lingua 70:131–162.
 Bradshaw, Joel (1979). "Obstruent harmony and tonogenesis in Jabêm." Lingua 49:189–205.
 Bradshaw, Joel (1983). "Dempwolff’s description of verb serialization in Yabem." In Amram Halim, Lois Carrington, and S. A. Wurm, eds., Papers from the Third International Conference on Austronesian Linguistics, vol. 4, Thematic variation, 177–198. Series C-77. Canberra: Pacific Linguistics.
 Bradshaw, Joel (1993). "Subject relationships within serial verb constructions in Numbami and Jabêm." Oceanic Linguistics 32:133–161.
 Bradshaw, Joel (1998). "Squib: Another look at velar lenition and tonogenesis in Jabêm." Oceanic Linguistics 37:178-181.
 Bradshaw, Joel (1999). "Null subjects, switch-reference, and serialization in Jabêm and Numbami." Oceanic Linguistics 38:270–296.
 Bradshaw, Joel (2001). "The elusive shape of the realis/irrealis distinction in Jabêm." In Joel Bradshaw and Kenneth L. Rehg, eds., Issues in Austronesian morphology: A focusschrift for Byron W. Bender, 75–85. Pacific Linguistics 519. Canberra: Pacific Linguistics. 
 Bradshaw, Joel, and Francisc Czobor (2005). Otto Dempwolff's grammar of the Jabêm language in New Guinea. Oceanic Linguistics Special Publication No. 32. Honolulu: University of Hawai‘i Press. 
 Dempwolff, Otto (1939). Grammatik der Jabêm-Sprache auf Neuguinea. Abhandlungen aus dem Gebiet der Auslandskunde, vol. 50. Hamburg: Friederichsen de Gruyter.
 Ross, Malcolm (1993). "Tonogenesis in the North Huon Gulf chain." In Jerold A. Edmondson and Kenneth J. Gregerson, eds., Tonality in Austronesian languages, 133–153. Oceanic Linguistics Special Publication No. 24. Honolulu: University of Hawai‘i Press.
 Streicher, J. F. (1982). Jabêm–English dictionary. Series C-68. Canberra: Pacific Linguistics. (First compiled by Heinrich Zahn in 1917; later translated and revised by J. F. Streicher.)
 Zahn, Heinrich (1940). Lehrbuch der Jabêmsprache (Deutsch-Neuguinea). Zeitschrift für Eingeborenen-Sprache, Beiheft 21. Berlin: Reimer.

External links 
 Yabem Wordlist at the Austronesian Basic Vocabulary Database

North Huon Gulf languages
Languages of Morobe Province
Tonal languages in non-tonal families